The Plabutsch Tunnel is an approximately 10 km long (east tunnel 9919m, west tunnel 10,085m) road tunnel in Austria which bypasses Graz on its western side.

References 

Road tunnels in Austria
Tunnels completed in 1987
Tunnels in the Alps